Kemps may refer to:

 Kemps (card game), a card game with many different names where the player must silently signal a partner to score points
 Kemps (company), a food company based in St. Paul, Minnesota